Basketball is a sport contested at the Summer Olympic Games. A men's basketball tournament was first held at the 1904 Olympics as a demonstration; it has been held at every Summer Olympics since 1936. In the 1972 Olympics, the final game between the United States and the Soviet Union was a controversial one, as the game's final three seconds were replayed three times by a FIBA (International Basketball Federation) official without the authority to do so, before the Soviet Union won their first gold medal, which would have been won by the United States if the game was not started against the rules. The U.S. filed a formal protest but was rejected by FIBA. As a result, the United States refused to accept the silver medal, and no player has ever claimed his medal. After a protest of the Soviet invasion of Afghanistan, the United States boycotted the 1980 Moscow Olympics. The Soviet Union boycotted the 1984 Los Angeles Olympics in response. Both boycotts affected basketball at the Olympics, as both had successful basketball teams at the time. Until 1992, the Olympics were restricted to “amateur” players. The advent of the state-sponsored "full-time amateur athlete" of the Eastern Bloc countries further eroded the ideology of the pure amateur, as it put the self-financed amateurs of the Western countries at a disadvantage. The Soviet Union entered teams of athletes who were all nominally students, soldiers, or working in a profession, but all of whom were in reality paid by the state to train on a full-time basis. In April 1989, through the leadership of Secretary General Borislav Stanković, FIBA approved the rule that allowed NBA players to compete in international tournaments, including the Olympics. In the next Olympics, the 1992 Summer Games, the "Dream Team" won the gold medal at the 1992 basketball tournament, with an average winning margin of 44 points per game, and without calling a single time out. By this time, the Soviet Union and Yugoslavia no longer existed, but their successor states continued to be among the leading forces. Two newly independent countries of the former Yugoslavia and Soviet Union, Croatia and Lithuania, won the silver and bronze medals respectively.

Americans Sue Bird and Diana Taurasi are the all-time leader for the most Olympic medals in basketball, with five gold, while Teresa Edwards has four gold and one bronze. Seven players have won four medals: American Lisa Leslie, Tamika Catchings, (each with four golds with the women's team) and Carmelo Anthony (three golds and one bronze with the men's team), the Soviet Gennadi Volnov (one gold, two silver, one bronze) and Sergei Belov (one gold, three bronze), and Australians Kristi Harrower and Lauren Jackson (both with three silvers and one bronze). Leslie, Bird, Catchings, and Taurasi are the all-time leaders for the most consecutive gold medal wins in basketball. Six other individuals, all American, have won three golds – Katie Smith, Dawn Staley, Sheryl Swoopes, Seimone Augustus, Sylvia Fowles, Kevin Durant – and 23 other players, not including the previously mentioned, have won three medals.

The United States of America is by far the most successful country in Olympic basketball, with United States men's teams having won 16 of 19 tournaments in which they participated, including seven consecutive titles from 1936 through 1968. United States women's teams have won 9 titles out of the 11 tournaments in which they competed, including seven in a row from 1996 to 2020. Besides the United States, Argentina is the only nation still in existence who has won either the men's or women's tournament. The Soviet Union, Yugoslavia and the Unified Team are the countries no longer in existence who have won the tournament. The United States are the defending champions in both men's and women's tournaments. As of the 2016 Summer Olympics, 90 medals (30 of each color) have been awarded to teams from 20 National Olympic Committees.

Two gold medal-winning teams were inducted to the Naismith Memorial Basketball Hall of Fame in 2010. The 1960 U.S. Olympic team featured four players who would eventually enter the Hall of Fame, a head coach who would enter the Hall as a contributor, and a team manager who entered the Hall as a coach. The 1992 U.S. Olympic team, better known as the "Dream Team", had 11 future Hall of Fame players, along with three coaches who were inducted to the Hall as coaches (one of whom was previously inducted separately for his accomplishments as a player).

On June 9, 2017, the Executive Board of the International Olympic Committee announced that 3x3 basketball would become an official Olympic sport as of the 2020 Summer Olympics in Tokyo, Japan, for both men and women.



Men
Individuals who have been inducted to the Naismith Hall of Fame (including announced members awaiting induction) are indicated as follows:
 Bold type: Inducted as players.
 Italics: Inducted in a non-playing role.

Basketball

3x3 Basketball

Women
Individuals who have been inducted to the Naismith Hall of Fame (including announced members awaiting induction) are indicated as follows:
 Bold type: Inducted as players.
 Italics: Inducted in a non-playing role.

Basketball

3x3 basketball

Athlete medal leaders

Men

Women

Notes
 The United States team members did not accept silver medals after a controversy in the gold medal game.

References
General

 (Hall of Famers inducted through 2011)
  (Induction class includes Don Barksdale, Katrina McClain, and Reggie Miller, all listed above)

Specific

External links
Basketball: Men's Basketball at Sports-Reference.com
Basketball: Women's Basketball at Sports-Reference.com

Basketball
medalists
Olympics